Mărginean is a Romanian surname. Notable people with the surname include:

Cosmin Mărginean (born 1978), Romanian footballer
Gabriela Mărginean (born 1987), Romanian women's basketball player
Radu Mărginean (born 1983), Romanian footballer

Romanian-language surnames